The Subaru Sumo, known as the Libero in European markets except the UK, Iceland, and Sweden, and as the Domingo in the Japanese market, is a cabover microvan produced from 1983 to 1998.  In Belgium, it was known as the Combi, and in Taiwan the latter generation was marketed as the Estratto. It was also called the Subaru E10 and Subaru E12 respectively in some places, the names referring to the size of the engines. The Sumo shared many characteristics with the Sambar, except it had extended front and rear bumpers and a larger engine borrowed from the Subaru Justy. Because of these modifications, it didn't conform to kei car regulations, which stipulate the maximum dimensions of the vehicle and the maximum engine displacement requirements, which then determine the vehicle tax to be paid.

It was launched with the option of four-wheel drive and powered by 997 cc, later 1,189 cc three-cylinder EF engines based on those used in the Subaru Justy although in the van they were rear mounted. Somewhat unusual for a microvan, the 1,200 cc Sumo could be ordered with selectable 4WD, operated via a gear stick mounted button. In normal driving conditions, only the rear wheels were driven, as there was no central differential to allow highway driving in 4WD mode. In 1994, Subaru's Full Time 4WD (S-AWD) was added to the options list with the ECVT transmission only and a viscous coupling. An oil cooler was installed on European versions to better facilitate light duty towing. The original Libero/Sumo remained available well after the release of the next generation Sambar.

The Sumo was discontinued when the sixth generation Sambar was introduced, and the market that the Sumo was targeted at was refocused towards the Subaru Forester, which, in comparison to the Sumo, had standard permanent 4WD, a more potent 2.5 L boxer engine and increased cargo capacity. In Japan, the Domingo's market segment is now served by the Subaru Exiga, which is capable of carrying up to seven passengers.

References

External links

Microvans
Vans
Vehicles with CVT transmission
All-wheel-drive vehicles
Rear-engined vehicles
Cab over vehicles
Rear-wheel-drive vehicles
1980s cars
1990s cars
Sumo